Yakoruda is a Bulgarian town located in the southwestern part of the country. A part of the Blagoevgrad Province, it is the seat of Yakuroda Municipality which is the north-easternmost in the province. The town lies in the Rhodope Mountains, along the Mesta River, 26 km west of the town of Velingrad. Yakoruda was proclaimed a town on 9 September 1964, having previously been officially classified as a village.

A plurality of the residents are Muslim Bulgarians (Pomaks), the rest being for the most part Eastern Orthodox.

Notable natives are Survivor BG season one runner-up Ahmed Shuganov and Minister of Labour and Social Policy Emiliya Maslarova.

Honour
Yakoruda Glacier on Greenwich Island in the South Shetland Islands, Antarctica is named after Yakoruda.

Gallery

External links
 Unofficial website  

Towns in Bulgaria
Populated places in Blagoevgrad Province